The 2012 United States House of Representatives elections in Iowa were held on Tuesday, November 6, 2012, to elect the state's four U.S. Representatives. The elections coincided with the elections of other federal and state offices, including a quadrennial presidential election. Primary elections were held on June 5, 2012.

The new congressional map, drawn by the state's Legislative Services Agency and passed with bipartisan support in the state House of Representatives and Senate, was signed into law by Governor Terry Branstad on April 19, 2011. Reflecting population shifts recorded in the 2010 United States Census, the new map decreases Iowa's representation from five congressional districts to four.

Overview

District 1

Bruce Braley, a Democrat the incumbent representative from the 1st district in northeastern Iowa since 2007, ran in the new 1st district. Fellow incumbent Dave Loebsack, who lived within the boundaries of the new 1st district in Linn County, but who had represented southeastern Iowa's 2nd district since 2007, moved to Johnson County and ran in the new 2nd district. The 1st district has become more favorable to Democrats with the inclusion of Linn County and its loss of Scott County. Braley won the Democratic nomination unopposed.

Democratic primary

Candidates

Nominee
Bruce Braley, incumbent U.S. Representative

Declined
Dave Loebsack, incumbent U.S. Representative for the 2nd district

Primary results

Republican primary

Candidates

Nominee
 Ben Lange, attorney and nominee for this seat in 2010

Eliminated in primary
 Rod Blum, businessman

Withdrawn
 Steve Rathje, businessman

Primary results

General election

Endorsements

Predictions

Results

District 2

None of Iowa's current members of Congress resided in the newly-drawn 2nd district; however, Democrat Dave Loebsack moved from Linn County to Johnson County in order to avoid a primary against Bruce Braley and continue representing southeastern Iowa. The 2nd district became slightly more favorable to Republicans as a result of the inclusion of Scott County, but retains Democratic-leaning Johnson County.

Democratic primary

Candidates

Nominee
 Dave Loebsack, incumbent U.S. Representative

Eliminated in primary
 Joe Seng, state senator

Primary results

Republican primary

Candidates

Nominee
 John Archer, senior legal counsel at John Deere

Eliminated in primary
 Dan Dolan, housing developer
Withdrew
 Richard Gates, machinist and Tea Party activist

Primary results

General election

Endorsements

Polling

Predictions

Results

District 3

Leonard Boswell, a Democrat who represented the 3rd district in central Iowa since 1997, and Tom Latham, a Republican who represented the 4th district in northern and central Iowa since 1995, both ran in the new 3rd district. Latham, who lived in the new 4th district, moved south to avoid facing fellow Republican Steve King in a primary.

Democratic primary

Candidates

Nominee
Leonard Boswell, incumbent U.S. Representative

Primary results

Republican primary

Candidates

Nominee
Tom Latham, incumbent U.S. Representative

Primary results

General election

Campaign
Approximately half of the new 3rd district is currently represented by Boswell, whereas the new 3rd district contains than 20 per cent of the area currently represented by Latham. However, Latham had $983,500 cash on hand at the end of March 2011, whereas Boswell had just $173,815.

Endorsements

Debates
The first debate was held October 10, 2012 at 7 pm, sponsored by KCCI and the Des Moines Register.

Complete video and transcript, C-SPAN, first debate, October 10, 2012

Polling

Predictions

Results

District 4

Steve King, a Republican represented western Iowa's 5th district since 2003, ran in the new 4th district. The new 4th district comprises mostly territory which King represented and which tends to vote for Republican candidates.

Republican primary

Candidates

Nominee
Steve King,, incumbent U.S. Representative

Declined
Tom Latham, incumbent U.S. Representative for the 5th district

Primary results

Democratic primary

Candidates

Nominee
Christie Vilsack, former First Lady of Iowa

Primary results

Independents
Martin James Monroe also ran.

General election

Endorsements

Polling

Predictions

Results

References

External links
Elections from the Iowa Secretary of State
United States House of Representatives elections in Iowa, 2012 at Ballotpedia
Iowa U.S. House from OurCampaigns.com
Campaign contributions for U.S. Congressional races in Iowa from OpenSecrets
Outside spending at the Sunlight Foundation

United States House of Representatives
Iowa
2012